Nelson Ku (6 June 1931 – 15 January 2007) was a Taiwanese politician and diplomat. He served in the Republic of China Navy from 1954 to 1997, retiring with the rank of admiral. He was a member of the Legislative Yuan from 2002 until his death.

Military career
Born Shanghai in 1931, Ku attended both the Republic of China Naval Academy and the United States Naval Academy, and entered the Republic of China Navy in 1954. He became close to Chen Shui-bian while serving as deputy defense minister between 1993 and 1994. As commander of the navy, a post he had assumed in 1994, Ku ended the Advanced Combat System, a program devised in the 1980s by Taiwan to develop a smaller version of the American-made Aegis Combat System. During his tenure, Ku reached an agreement with the United States Navy that allowed the Republic of China Navy use of American rescue vessels, if needed.

Political career
Ku became the Republic of China's representative to the Netherlands in 1997. Chen Shui-bian assumed the presidency in 2000, and due to the friendship between Chen and Ku, it was speculated that Ku would accept an appointment as minister of defense in the Chen administration, a post that went to Wu Shih-wen. After three years as a diplomat, Ku was recalled and expected to retire. However, Ku was named to the People First Party proportional representation ballot in 2001. For accepting the nomination, he was expelled from the Kuomintang. He was strongly opposed to a 2002 proposal to acquire Kidd-class destroyers from the United States, favoring the purchase of Aegis-enabled vessels instead. Ku was critical of a separate plan to buy Standard SM-II missiles for over NT$40 million each. In 2003, Ku published a book about his naval career and joined the Friends of the PFP. The next year, two members of the United States House of Representatives proposed that Taiwan send the Republic of China Marine Corps to engage in the Iraq War, a move Ku believed to be unnecessary. He was involved in another discussion about the cost of arms procurement in October, over a set of special appropriations that cost NT$610.8 billion. Ku was again named a PFP at-large legislative candidate for the 2004 elections, and won. In 2005, he voted against an arms procurement bill that sought to fund a $480 billion purchase of eight diesel submarines along with missile batteries and military aircraft, berating the government for its dependence on the United States.

Ku was hospitalized in November 2006, and died of lymphatic cancer at Tri-Service General Hospital on 15 January 2007, aged 75.

References

1931 births
2007 deaths
Republic of China Navy admirals
Taiwanese people from Shanghai
Republic of China politicians from Shanghai
Deaths from lymphoma
Deaths from cancer in Taiwan
Members of the 5th Legislative Yuan
Members of the 6th Legislative Yuan
People First Party Members of the Legislative Yuan
Party List Members of the Legislative Yuan
Expelled members of the Kuomintang
Representatives of Taiwan to the Netherlands
United States Naval Academy alumni
Taiwanese Ministers of National Defense